The 2008 Meijer Indy 300 was the fourteenth round of the 2008 IndyCar Series season. It took place on August 9, 2008. This was the eighth time that IndyCar went to Kentucky Speedway.

Race 

Meijer Indy 300
Meijer Indy 300
Meijer Indy 300
Kentucky Indy 300